Çakırtaş is a village in the District of Iğdır, Iğdır Province, in eastern Turkey. In 2019 it had a population of 609.

References

Villages in Iğdır Province
Populated places in Iğdır Province
Villages in Turkey
Iğdır Central District